Giovanni Antonio Giustiniani (Madrid, 1676 - Genoa, 1735) was the 142nd Doge of the Republic of Genoa and king of Corsica.

Biography 
Member of the noble Giustiniani family, he was born in Madrid around 1676. The elections of September 22, 1713 elected him new doge of the Republic of Genoa, the ninety-seventh in biennial succession and the one hundred and forty-second in republican history. As doge he was also invested with the related biennial office of king of Corsica. Giustiniani ended his term on September 22, 1715 and died in Genoa in 1735.

See also 

 Republic of Genoa
 Doge of Genoa

References 

18th-century Doges of Genoa
People from Madrid
1676 births
1735 deaths